Access Atlantech Edutainment (also known as AAT or AAT Media College) is a media education institution in India. It operates diploma, degree and post-graduate programs covering various aspects of media studies in partnership with others such as Dibrugarh University, Hindustan University and the University of Bolton.

History 
AAT started operations in June 2000 in Chennai and since then has established a significant pan-India presence across Mumbai, Dibrugarh, Bangalore, Kochi, Coimbatore, Delhi and Trivandrum as well. The first college to have a three-year full-time degree in audio & Music Production  The Times Group (or Bennett, Coleman & Co. Ltd.) is a stakeholder of Access Atlantech Edutainment.

Data 
	The first in India to offer a UGC-recognized B.Sc. program in visual communication with a specialization in the final year.
	Over 250 media companies where students have found work, including BBC, CNBC, Radio Mirchi, Infosys, Tata Elxsi, and Yashraj Films.
	More than 3,000 media aspirants have graduated AAT's courses in the last decade.
	Over 500 corporate tie-ups for internships.
	More than 100 specialized media workstations across three campuses in audio, film, animation, video effects, and gaming.
	5+ partners to impart media education at various academic levels.

Programs offered 
Diploma Program (24 months) (In association with Backstage Academy, UK)

	Advanced Diploma in show production

Under-graduate Degree Program (36 months) (In association with Dibrugarh University)

	B.Sc. in visual communication with a specialization in the final year.

 Students can specialize in either digital film making or audio engineering or animation and visual effects
 Students study all three years in India.

Under-graduate Degree Program (36 months) (In association with the University of Bolton)

	B.Sc. in visual communication with a specialization in the final year.

 Students can specialize in either digital film making or audio engineering or animation and visual effects
 Students spend the first two years in India and the third year in the UK.

Post-graduate Degree Program (24 months) (In association with Hindustan University)

	MBA in media management

 Students spend the first year in Hindustan University's campus and the second year in AAT's Chennai campus.

Post-graduate Degree Program (24 months) (In association with the University of Bolton)

	MBA in media management

 Students spend the first year in AAT's Chennai campus and the second year in the UK.

See also
 Cinema of India
 Film and Television Institute of India
 Government Film and Television Institute
 State Institute of Film and Television
 Satyajit Ray Film and Television Institute
 Bhartendu Natya Academy
 K. R. Narayanan National Institute of Visual Science and Arts
 M.G.R. Government Film and Television Training Institute
 Biju Patnaik Film and Television Institute of Odisha

Notes

References 

	IndiaEduNews: http://www.indiaedunews.net/pressreleases/users/SAE_and_AAT_Media_College_to_offer_UGC_recognized_B.Sc_in_Visual_Communication_1.asp
	Economic Times: http://articles.economictimes.indiatimes.com/2006-03-03/news/27445913_1_cgc-college-bccl-training-in-technology-applications
	Careers360: https://web.archive.org/web/20120315021856/http://www.careers360.com/news/newsdetails.aspx?category=251&news_id=4214
	Afaqs: http://www.afaqs.com/news/company_briefs/index.html?id=48953_SAE+and+AAT+Media+College+offers+UGC+recognise+BSC+course

Film schools in India
Broadcasting schools